Gregory Green, known professionally as Grant Green Jr.,  is a jazz guitarist and the eldest son of jazz guitarist Grant Green. He is a member of the group Masters of Groove with Bernard Purdie and Reuben Wilson. Born in St Louis, Missouri on August 4, 1955, Grant Green Jr. started playing guitar at the age of fourteen. In 1969 he moved to Detroit with his father, who died ten years later. His neighbors included Stevie Wonder's parents, Marvin Gaye, and members of the Four Tops. He has worked with Richard "Groove" Holmes, Leon Thomas, Jimmy McGriff, Lou Donaldson, and Lonnie Smith.

Discography

As leader
 Back to the Groove (Paddle Wheel, 1997)
 Jungle Strut (Venus, 1997 [1998])
 Introducing G.G. (Jazzateria, 2002)
 Thank You Mr. Bacharach (ZMI, 2022)

With Bernard Purdie and Reuben Wilson
 The Masters of Groove - Meet Dr. No (Jazzateria, 2001)
 The Masters of Groove - Meet DJ-9 (Jazzateria, 2006)
 The Godfathers of Groove (18th & Vine, 2007) [note: originally released as The Masters of Groove]
 The Godfathers of Groove 3 (18th & Vine, 2009)

As sideman
With Reuben Wilson
 Organ Blues (Jazzateria, 2002)
Movin' On (Savant, 2006)

References

External links
 Official site

Living people
1955 births
Musicians from St. Louis
Guitarists from New York City
African-American jazz guitarists
American jazz guitarists
20th-century American guitarists
Jazz musicians from New York (state)
Jazz musicians from Missouri
The Quark Alliance members
20th-century African-American musicians
21st-century African-American people